LkCa 15 is a T Tauri star in the Taurus Molecular Cloud. These types of stars are relatively young pre-main-sequence stars that show irregular variations in brightness. It has a mass that is about 97% of the Sun, an effective temperature of 4370 K, and is slightly cooler than the Sun. Its apparent magnitude is 11.91, meaning it is not visible to the naked eye.

Planetary system
LkCa 15 is surrounded by a protoplanetary disk, typical of many T Tauri stars. The disk around the star is about 55 times more massive than Jupiter, and consists of three major belts (components). Small changes in the observed brightness of the disk may be due to a planetary companion; the star was believed to have a protoplanetary object or exoplanet orbiting it, known as LkCa 15 b This name stems from an older survey. Later, the existence of up to three planets was suspected. The planets' existence was refuted in 2019 as higher resolution imaging became available.

LkCa 15 b is a candidate protoplanetary object in orbit around LkCa 15, a star in the Taurus-Auriga Star Forming Region. It was discovered by direct imaging techniques using the Keck II telescope in 2011 by Adam Kraus and Michael Ireland. A 2015 study of observations from the Magellan Telescopes and the Large Binocular Telescope argued that the planet is forming through accretion. It is the first observed exoplanet seen in the process of active accretion. The planet existence was refuted in 2019 as higher resolution imaging has become available.

References

Pre-main-sequence stars
K-type main-sequence stars
T Tauri stars
Tauri, V1079
IRAS catalogue objects
J04391779+2221034
Hypothetical planetary systems
Circumstellar disks
Taurus (constellation)